Xylocarpus moluccensis is a tree in the family Meliaceae. It is named for the Moluccas archipelago (now Maluku Islands).

Description

The flowers are creamy-white.

Distribution and habitat
Xylocarpus moluccensis grows naturally from the Sundarbans of India and Bangladesh through Mainland Southeast Asia and Malesia to tropical Australia. Its habitat is mangrove swamps.

References

Meliaceae
Trees of Indo-China
Trees of Malesia
Trees of Papuasia
Trees of Australia
Trees of Bangladesh
Flora of West Bengal
Flora of the Maluku Islands
Plants described in 1785
Central Indo-Pacific flora
Mangroves